This is a list of countries by carbon dioxide emissions per capita per year.

The first section is devoted to emissions based on the production of goods and services within each country (also known as territorial-based emissions). It provides data regarding carbon dioxide emissions from the burning of fossil fuels and cement manufacture but not emissions from land-use, land-use change and forestry (which includes deforestation). Emissions from international shipping or bunker fuels are also not included in national figures, which can make a significant difference for small countries with important ports.

The second section provides data regarding emissions based on consumption of goods and services in each country. In addition to the emissions from goods and services produced locally, consumption-based accounting also includes the emissions from the consumption of goods and services produced abroad, i.e. imports, while it excludes emissions from the production of goods and services consumed abroad, i.e. exports. As it takes into account the emissions embodied in international trade, it is thus also known as trade-adjusted emissions accounting.

Carbon dioxide is the most important, though not the only anthropogenic greenhouse gas. For a more complete idea of how a country influences climate change, gases such as methane and nitrous oxide should be taken into account. This is particularly so in agricultural economies.

Carbon dioxide emissions are also known for earlier periods. A study of a global sample of twelve countries provide estimates for  emissions since 1800 and explores the long-run drivers of carbon dioxide emissions by decomposing changes in carbon emissions into population, income, technological and energy mix changes.

Production-based emissions: annual carbon dioxide emissions in metric tons per capita

Consumption-based emissions: annual carbon dioxide emissions in metric tons per capita

See also 

 List of countries by greenhouse gas emissions per capita
 List of countries by greenhouse gas emissions
 List of countries by carbon dioxide emissions
 List of countries by renewable electricity production
 List of U.S. states and territories by carbon dioxide emissions
 Avoiding Dangerous Climate Change
 Carbon cycle
 Kyoto Protocol
 Life-cycle greenhouse gas emissions of energy sources

Notes

External links 
 OECD Stats Extracts - Detailed OECD country level environment statistics
 World Per Capita Carbon Dioxide Emissions - exhaustive and up to date list of statistic by country from Energy Information Administration (spreadsheet format)
 World Per Capita Carbon Footprint   - exhaustive and up to date list of carbon footprint distributed on countries Norwegian University of Science and Technology
 World Bank Data -  emissions (metric tons per capita), currently includes 2010 data.

Carbon dioxide
Carbon dioxide emissions per capita
countries, Carbon
Carbon dioxide emissions per capita
Carbon dioxide emissions